The Pipeline Open Data Standard (PODS) Pipeline Data Model provides the database architecture pipeline operators use to store critical information and analysis data about their pipeline systems, and to manage this data geospatially in a linear-referenced database which can then be visualized in any GIS platform.

Since its inception in 1998 PODS has supported the growing and changing needs of the pipeline industry through ongoing development and maintenance of the Data Model and Standards. This is accomplished through a volunteer based technical committee, responsible for the strategic technical direction of the PODS Association. The work, including debate, deliberation, and resulting recommendations, is conducted through an assigned project team and work groups.  

The PODS Association is a non-profit (501 (c) member-driven organization. There are 12 board members with renewals / elections being held each year. As of November 2022 the following supporting roles have been created: Education Coordinator, Marketing and Communications Coordinator, Membership Coordinator, Technical Coordinator.  The Executive Director role continues to be the one full time position within the organization.

PODS Members 
The PODS Association members include large and small pipeline operators worldwide and the suppliers, developers, and vendors that support them. Government agencies are also members. The United States Pipeline and Hazardous Materials Safety Administration (PHMSA) uses the PODS model for its baseline in loading into the National Pipeline Mapping System (NPMS).

The PODS data model has been implemented by over 200 pipeline operators in 36 countries, representing over 3 million miles of linear pipeline assets and systems including facilities, storage, stations, etc. over the last 25 years.  A membership directory can be found on PODS.org.

Strategic and Tactical Plan for PODS 
Now more than ever, visibility and optimization of in-ground assets are vital to our industry. The PODS organization maintains 4 strategic goals:

Goal 1 
Establish a single logical data model capable of generating multiple physical data models that are vendor–neutral and tested in accordance with PODS' Testing plan. The result is a well–documented pipeline data model that meets current and future pipeline industry needs.

Goal 2 
Provide robust communications to member organizations and stakeholders to advance understanding.

Goal 3 
Offer clear and complete standards implementation guidance and PODS training services education on PODS fundamentals.

Goal 4 
Retain, sustain and grow membership based upon solid value proposition to member organizations. Successfully engage members as volunteers for PODS committees.

PODS Model History 
Since its inception, the PODS Association has supported continued development of the PODS Data Model in order to meet the needs of the pipeline industry.  Government regulation and technological advancement of integrity and risk management applications have driven much of this progress.  

PRE-PODS ISAT Data Model, released in 1993

PODS 2.0, released in 2001, with fewer than 70 tables.

PODS 3.0, released in 2002, doubled in size, including several submodels.

PODS 3.1, released in 2003

PODS 3.2, released in 2004 with 157 tables

PODS 3.2.1, released in 2004, maintenance release.

PODS 4.0, released in 2006, includes ILI submodel and documentation.

PODS 4.0.1, released in 2007, maintenance release.

PODS 4.0.2, released in 2007, maintenance release.

PODS 5.0, released 2009, contains 198 Sub-Models, 652 Tables, and 4,843 Columns.

PODS 5.0 ESRI Spatial GeoDatabase, released 2010.

PODS ESRI Spatial 5.1.1, Released in 2012

PODS 6.0 Relational, released in 2012

PODS ESRI Spatial 6.0, Released in 2014

PODS Lite 7.0, released in 2017

PODS Lite Geodatabase for APR, released in 2017\

PODS 7.0, released in 2019

PODS 7.0.1, released in 2021

See also 

 Gas Technology Institute (formerly Gas Research Institute)
 Open specifications
 Open standard
 Pipeline transport

References

External links
 PODS home page

Standards
Non-profit organizations based in Oklahoma
Organizations established in 1998
Pipeline transport